China National Heavy Duty Truck Group Co., Ltd., CNHTC or Sinotruk Group is a Chinese state-owned truck manufacturer headquartered in Jinan, Shandong province. It is currently the third largest truck manufacturer in Mainland China. It is known for developing and manufacturing China's first heavy duty truck - "Huanghe" (黄河, lit. Yellow River) JN150.

History 

CNHTC was founded in 1935 by Kuomintang Government of the Republic of China era on the basis of Jinan Automobile Works. It started developing heavy-duty trucks in 1956, with its first truck modeled after Skoda 706RT. In 1984, Jinan Automobile Works began to produce Steyr 91 with technology imported from Steyr-Daimler-Puch. Since the reform and restructure in 2001, the company has got rid of the operating losses for previous years.

Most of the group assets was now listed on the Stock Exchange of Hong Kong in 2007, as a Hong Kong-incorporated company, Sinotruk (Hong Kong). Another subsidiary (subsidiary of Sinotruk (Hong Kong)), Sinotruk Jinan Truck (SZSE:000951), was listed on the Shenzhen Stock Exchange.

Sinotruk sells trucks in various South American countries. They came to Brazil in response to a group of businessmen with experience in the transportation industry. Sinotruk has sold 2,000 vehicles thus far. Sinotruk began building their first plant outside China in 2013 with an initial investment of more than 300 million dollars. Its location will be in Lages, Brazil.

Sinotruk also produces trucks in Pakistan through a joint venture with Dysin Automobiles.

They are also active in the Philippines as well since 2011 through dealership, selling light and heavy trucks.

In October 2019, Shandong Heavy Industry became the controlling shareholder of "China National Heavy Duty Truck Group", acquiring a 45% stake.

References

External links

Truck manufacturers of China
Government-owned companies of China
Companies based in Jinan
Vehicle manufacturing companies established in 1935
Chinese brands
Chinese companies established in 1935